Rosebud is a city in Gasconade County, Missouri, United States. The population was 390 at the 2020 census.

Geography
Rosebud is located at  (38.386579, -91.401899).

Climate

According to the Köppen Climate Classification system, Rosebud has a humid subtropical climate, abbreviated "Cfa" on climate maps.

Demographics

2010 census
As of the census of 2010, there were 409 people, 179 households, and 107 families living in the city. The racial makeup of the city was 97.1% White, 0.2% Native American, 1.0% Asian, 0.2% Pacific Islander, 0.5% from other races, and 1.0% from two or more races. Hispanic or Latino of any race were 1.7% of the population.

There were 179 households   26.8% had children under the age of 18 living with them, 47.5% were married couples living together, 10.1% had a female householder with no husband present, 2.2% had a male householder with no wife present, and 40.2% were non-families. 34.1% of all households were made up of individuals, and 15.1% had someone living alone who was 65 years of age or older. The average household size was 2.28 and the average family size was 2.88.

The median age in the city was 43.2 years. 22.7% of residents were under the age of 18; 5.9% were between the ages of 18 and 24; 24.7% were from 25 to 44; 27.4% were from 45 to 64; and 19.3% were 65 years of age or older. The gender makeup of the city was 47.4% male and 52.6% female.

2000 census
As of the census of 2000, there were 364 people, 155 households, and 103 families living in the city. The population density was 1,119.4 people per square mile (425.9/km). There were 165 housing units at an average density of 507.4 per square mile (193.1/km). The racial makeup of the city was 97.53% White, 0.27% African American, and 2.20% from two or more races.

There were 155 households, out of which 31.6% had children under the age of 18 living with them, 55.5% were married couples living together, 8.4% had a female householder with no husband present, and 33.5% were non-families. 32.3% of all households were made up of individuals, and 17.4% had someone living alone who was 65 years of age or older. The average household size was 2.35 and the average family size was 2.88.

In the city the population was spread out, with 25.8% under the age of 18, 9.6% from 18 to 24, 27.7% from 25 to 44, 17.9% from 45 to 64, and 19.0% who were 65 years of age or older. The median age was 36 years. For every 100 females, there were 91.6 males. For every 100 females age 18 and over, there were 90.1 males.

The median income for a household in the city was $29,688, and the median income for a family was $33,750. Males had a median income of $24,766 versus $17,857 for females. The per capita income for the city was $18,513. About 13.5% of families and 23.3% of the population were below the poverty line, including 30.2% of those under age 18 and 16.4% of those age 65 or over.

References

Cities in Gasconade County, Missouri
Cities in Missouri